Bluegrove is an unincorporated community on Farm to Market Road 172 11 miles southeast of Henrietta in central Clay County, Texas, United States.

Early settlers named the area for the post oak trees that appeared blue from a distance at certain times of the day. The Bluegrove Baptist Church was established in 1878 by families living in the area around what would become the town, and is the oldest permanent Baptist church in Wichita, Archer, and Clay Counties. The church originally met in the school before constructing a church building at its present location in 1893.  J.L. Russell was among the earliest settlers before there was a town, homesteading a mile south of the present day community.  He was a founder of the Bluegrove Baptist Church, and donated the northeast corner of his land for the creation of the Bluegrove Cemetery, one mile due south of the community.  Bluegrove also had a Methodist church and Church of Christ, which have since disbanded.  The Bluegrove Community Center, which houses numerous historical photographs, is located in the old Methodist Church.

Though settlers began homesteading in the area in the 1870s leading to the founding of the school and church before there was a town, settlement of the town began after 1882 when E.A. Copp, L.B. Brown, and E.M. Childs divided into lots the land where their original homesteads intersected and sold them to settlers to create Blue Grove, later changed to its current spelling by the postal service. A.W. Flinn established a general store and Bluegrove quickly became an economic hub for local farmers and ranchers. In 1895, Bluegrove received its post office, which is still in operation.  The town at one time contained a blacksmith shop, garage, laundromat, pharmacy, several doctor's offices, hardware store, automobile and tractor dealership, movie theater, and numerous other businesses. Passed by major thoroughfares and railroads, most of the businesses were destroyed by a major fire in 1942, and due to the hard times of the Great Depression, boys going off to fight in World War II, and easier transportation most businesses either did not rebuild or chose to relocate to Henrietta.  Bluegrove reached a population high in the 1920s of 240, but declined throughout the 20th Century and reported a population of 125 at century's end. The town remains a farming and ranching community.  Founded in 1938 and still headquartered in Bluegrove the J-A-C Electric Cooperative serves Jack, Archer, and Clay counties.

Education 
The Bluegrove School was founded by 1878, and went through the 11th Grade and competed against neighboring schools in baseball, basketball, volleyball, and track.  The school closed in 1941 when the surrounding communities consolidated to form the Midway Independent School District. Due to World War II construction of Midway I.S.D. was not completed until 1947, so students were bussed to Bluegrove which served as Midway until the new building opened.  School buildings from the other communities were moved to Bluegrove to house the consolidated students.  The school is called Midway because it is located "midway" between Bluegrove to the north and Joy to the south.
The old Bluegrove gymnasium built in 1937 by the Works Progress Administration (WPA) is the only building left, and is now the warehouse for the J-A-C Electric Cooperative.

References

External links 
 Bluegrove Baptist Church http://www.bluegrovebc.org
 Clay County 1890 Jail Museum-Heritage Center  http://claycountyjailmuseum.com/
 Bluegrove Cemetery http://tn-roots.com/Clay/cemeteries/bluegrove.htm
 Bluegrove Cemetery http://www.cemeteries-of-tx.com/Wtx/Clay/cemetery/Blue%20GroveFM.htm
 Bluegrove Cemetery http://www.findagrave.com/cgi-bin/fg.cgi?page=cr&GSln=South&GSiman=1&GScid=2468&CRid=2468&pt=Bluegrove%20Cemetery&
 

Unincorporated communities in Clay County, Texas
Unincorporated communities in Texas
Wichita Falls metropolitan area